Robert Burley (born March 18, 1957) is a Canadian photographer of architecture and the urban landscape. He is based in Toronto, Canada, and is a Fellow of the Royal Society of Canada.

Life and work 
Robert Burley grew up in rural Ontario in the town of Picton. He studied Media Studies at Ryerson Polytechnical Institute (now Toronto Metropolitan University), Toronto (BAA 1980) and later pursued graduate studies in photography at the School of the Art Institute of Chicago (MFA 1986). While living in Chicago, Burley trained briefly with Hedrich-Blessing Photographers before returning to Toronto to establish Design Archive, a firm specializing in architectural photography. From 1997 to 2021 Burley was a professor at Ryerson University's School of Image Arts where he helped create new programs and resources related to photography. These include his contributions to the creation of Ryerson Library's Special Collections, the acquisition of the Black Star (photo agency) Collection, and his position as one of the founding Program Directors of the graduate program in Film + Photographic Preservation. Throughout his career, Burley has executed numerous commissioned and self-directed multi-year projects realized as books and exhibitions. These include:

 O’Hare: Airfield on the Prairie (Chicago History Museum 1989) 
 Viewing Olmsted: Photographs by Robert Burley, Lee Friedlander and Geoffrey James (Canadian Centre for Architecture 1997)  
 The Disappearance of Darkness: Photography at the end of the analog era (Princeton Architectural Press 2014)   
 An Enduring Wilderness: Toronto’s Natural Parklands (ECW Press 2017)  
 An Accidental Wilderness: The Origins and Ecology of Toronto’s Tommy Thompson Park (University of Toronto Press 2020)

Selected Collections
National Gallery of Canada
Yale University Art Gallery
Art Gallery of Hamilton
George Eastman Museum
Library Archives Canada
Fotomuseum Antwerpen
Canadian Centre for Architecture
Chicago History Museum
City of Toronto Archives
Doris McCarthy Gallery, University of Toronto
Musée Nicéphore Niépce, France
Musée des Beaux-Arts de Montréal
Ryerson Image Centre
Vancouver Art Gallery

Awards 
 2010: Mellon Senior Fellow – Canadian Centre for Architecture
 2018: Fellow of the Royal Society of Canada 
 2018: Planning Excellence Award – Publication, Canadian Institute of Planners
2020: Award of Excellence – Research – The Canadian Society of Landscape Architects
2021: Heritage Toronto Award – Book – Accidental Wilderness: The Origins and Ecology of Toronto's Tommy Thompson Park

References

External links 

 
 Robert Burley: Photographic Proof at Canadian Centre for Architecture
From the End of the Analog Era to the Enduring Wilderness, Robert Burley's interview on LensCulture

20th-century Canadian photographers
21st-century Canadian photographers
Architectural photographers
People from Prince Edward County, Ontario
Photography academics
Toronto Metropolitan University alumni
Academic staff of Toronto Metropolitan University
School of the Art Institute of Chicago alumni
1957 births
Living people
Artists from Toronto
Fellows of the Royal Society of Canada